Borealonectes is a genus of rhomaleosaurid pliosauroid, a type of plesiosaur.  Its fossils were found in the Callovian-age (Middle Jurassic, about 165-161 million years ago) Hiccles Cove Formation of Melville Island, Canada, one of the islands in the Canadian Arctic Archipelago.  It is based on a skull, neck vertebrae, and the right forelimb of one individual. Named in 2008 by Sato and Wu, Borealonectes is one of the few plesiosaurs known from the Jurassic of North America, and the first marine reptile from the Canadian Arctic with a well-preserved skull. The type species is B. russelli.

See also
 Timeline of plesiosaur research
 List of plesiosaur genera

References

Middle Jurassic plesiosaurs
Middle Jurassic reptiles of North America
Prehistory of the Arctic
Jurassic plesiosaurs of North America
Fossil taxa described in 2008
Sauropterygian genera